Formula 409 or 409 is an American brand of home and industrial cleaning products well known in the United States, but virtually unknown in other places. It includes Formula 409 All-Purpose Cleaner, Formula 409 Glass and Surface Cleaner, Formula 409 Carpet Cleaner, and many others. The brand is currently owned by Clorox.

The flagship product was invented in 1957 by Morris D. Rouff, whose Michigan company manufactured industrial cleaning supplies. Formula 409’s original application was as a commercial solvent and degreaser for industries that struggled with particularly difficult cleaning problems.

The inventor's son has stated that it was named for the birthday of the inventor's wife, Ruth, on April the 9th (rendered in the American style with the month first as "4/09"). The company, however, claims that it was named as the 409th compound tested by the inventors. Other claimed origins for the name include 409 being the telephone area code where it was invented (area code 409, which serves southeastern Texas, was not introduced until 1983); the birthday of some other person, such as the inventor's daughter; or a reference to a powerful Chevrolet car engine used in the 1960s.

In 1960, Rouff sold Formula 409 to Chemzol, a New York firm, for an amount in the low six-figure range. In the mid-1960s, entrepreneur Wilson Harrell, along with longtime friend David Woodcock and television personality Art Linkletter, bought Formula 409. Harrell, Woodcock & Linkletter bought it for $30,000 and took it national. Linkletter also promoted the product in television commercials. The company eventually took Formula 409 to a 55 percent share of the spray-cleaner market, and six years later, Harrell, Woodcock & Linkletter sold the company to Clorox for $7 million.

In early 2020 Formula 409 became impossible to find in stores and disappeared from the "products" listing at the Clorox website. Some websites say Clorox has discontinued the product. There has been no announcement or news release, and the website www.formula409.com is still active. Formula 409 is currently (January 16, 2022) sold at Walmart, Target, grocery and numerous other stores. The packaging has been changed.

Advertising

During the period when Art Linkletter was a part-owner of the Formula 409 brand, he was the commercial spokesperson.

Throughout the early 1970s, commercials featured Betty Boop.

In the late 1990s to the early 2000s, a cover of The Beach Boys' 1962 song "409" was used. The song's title refers to the name of the Chevrolet engine.

One commercial from 2005 shows a fictional Formula 410. As a character hits the trigger, electricity shoots out instead of spray. The announcer says, "Because the world is not ready for Formula 410, there's Formula 409".

In popular culture
Detroit rock group Electric Six released a song named for the product on their 2008 album Flashy. The song references how the product might be used to "clean your kitchen". The music video features band members using spray bottles of Formula 409 Glass and Surface Cleaner to clean the windows of the Lafayette Coney Island restaurant in downtown Detroit.

In the season 5 episode Mind's Eye of the TV-show The X-Files from 1998, a detective claims that Marty Glen (played by guest star Lili Taylor), a suspect and the Villain of the week of the episode, had been found "at the scene doing a Formula 409.", i.e. cleaning a bathroom that had been the crime scene of a murder.

References

External links
 Official site

Cleaning products
Clorox brands
Products introduced in 1957